Healing Is Difficult is the second studio album by Australian singer and songwriter Sia. It was released in the United Kingdom on 9 July 2001 and in the United States on 28 May 2002.

In the UK the album's first single "Taken for Granted" was released in early 2000 and peaked at number 10 on the UK Singles Chart. A low-budget music video was made for around $50. The follow-up "Little Man" peaked at number 85, and the song received a two-step garage remix which was popular at the time. A third single, "Drink to Get Drunk", was planned. However, only the "Different Gear" Remix received a limited release across Europe, promoted as "Different Gear vs. Sia". Its peak position was number 91 in the UK, 85 in the Netherlands, 55 in Belgium and number 1 on that country's dance chart.

The fourth and final single planned was "Blow It All Away", which was re-recorded as "Throw It All Away" due to the September 11 attacks. However, the single failed to surface. The album had no chart success in the United Kingdom due to lack of promotion. The track "Sober and Unkissed" was originally featured on Sia's first solo album OnlySee under the title "Soon", and "I'm Not Important to You" was originally performed by Sia with her band Crisp for their album The Word and the Deal in 1996 as the track "Sia's Song".

Singles
The first single entered and peaked at number 10 on the UK Singles Chart on 3 June 2000. Sia even performed the song on Jo Whiley's BBC Radio 1 radio show. The next two singles did not match the success of the first. In 2002 "Taken for Granted" peaked at number 100 on the Australian ARIA Singles Chart. In April 2002 the album debuted at number 99, staying there for a week. It also reached number 9 on the ARIA Hitseekers Albums Chart.

Chartifacts – 15 April 2002
No. 99 HEALING IS DIFFICULT – Sia Sia (See-AH) is an Australian singer/songwriter based in London who incorporates hip hop, funk and soul as a base for her incredible vocal styling and harmonies. Her first single Taken For Granted peaked at #10 on the UK chart but did not make such a dent in our local chart. Her influences range from Stevie Wonder to Lauryn Hill and Sting.

Track listing

Personnel
 Sia Furler - vocals, background vocals
 Otto Williams - bass (1,7)
 Quadraphonic (Richard Louis Simmonds and Tony Rapacioli) - violin (3)
 Isobel Dunn - arrangement, viola (4)
 Blair MacKichan - violin, producer (4)
 Jesse Flavell - guitar, producer (7)
 Camille - violin, viola, cello (4)
 Violet - strings arrangements, strings (3)
 Rod Youngs - drums

Charts

Album

Singles

References

2000 albums
Sia (musician) albums
Contemporary R&B albums by Australian artists
Soul jazz albums